2016 Nadeshiko League Cup Final was the 9th final of the Nadeshiko League Cup competition. The final was played at Nishigaoka Soccer Stadium in Tokyo on September 3, 2016. Nippon TV Beleza won the championship.

Overview
Nippon TV Beleza won their 4th title, by defeating JEF United Chiba Ladies 4–0 with Yuka Momiki, Mina Tanaka and Rin Sumida goal.

Match details

See also
2016 Nadeshiko League Cup

References

Nadeshiko League Cup
2016 in Japanese women's football